The 2021 WTA Tour was the elite professional tennis circuit organised by the Women's Tennis Association (WTA) for the 2021 tennis season. The 2021 WTA Tour calendar comprises the Grand Slam tournaments (supervised by the International Tennis Federation (ITF)), the WTA 1000 tournaments, the WTA 500 tournaments, the WTA 250 tournaments, the Billie Jean King Cup (organized by the ITF), and the year-end championships (the WTA Finals and the WTA Elite Trophy). Also included in the 2021 calendar are the Summer Olympic Games, which were rescheduled from 2020.

Schedule 
This is the complete schedule of events on the 2021 calendar.
Key

January

February

March

April

May

June

July

August

September

October

November

Affected tournaments 
The COVID-19 pandemic affected tournaments on both the ATP and WTA tours. The following tournaments were cancelled or postponed due to the COVID-19 pandemic.

Statistical information
These tables present the number of singles (S), doubles (D), and mixed doubles (X) titles won by each player and each nation during the season, within all the tournament categories of the 2019 WTA Tour: the Grand Slam tournaments, the year-end championships (the WTA Tour Championships and the WTA Elite Trophy), the WTA Premier tournaments (WTA 1000 and WTA 500), and the WTA 250. The players/nations are sorted by:

 total number of titles (a doubles title won by two players representing the same nation counts as only one win for the nation);
 cumulated importance of those titles (one Grand Slam win equalling two WTA 1000 wins, one year-end championships win equalling one-and-a-half WTA 1000 win, one WTA 1000 win equalling two WTA 500 wins, one WTA 500 win equalling two WTA 250 wins);
 a singles > doubles > mixed doubles hierarchy;
 alphabetical order (by family names for players).

Key

Titles won by player

Titles won by nation

Titles information
The following players won their first main circuit title in singles, doubles, or mixed doubles:
Singles

 Clara Tauson – Lyon (draw) 
 Sara Sorribes Tormo – Guadalajara (draw)
 Leylah Fernandez – Monterrey (draw)
 María Camila Osorio Serrano – Bogotá (draw)
 Veronika Kudermetova – Charleston 1 (draw)
 Astra Sharma (25 years, 219 days) – Charleston 2 (draw)
 Paula Badosa – Belgrade (draw)
 Barbora Krejčíková – Strasbourg (draw)
 Ons Jabeur – Birmingham (draw)
 Liudmila Samsonova – Berlin (draw)
 Elena-Gabriela Ruse – Hamburg (draw)
 Tamara Zidanšek – Lausanne (draw)
 Maryna Zanevska – Gdynia (draw)
 Danielle Collins – Palermo (draw)
 Emma Raducanu – US Open (draw)
 Jasmine Paolini – Portorož (draw)
 Ann Li – Tenerife (draw)

Doubles

 Ankita Raina – Melbourne 4 (draw)
 Kamilla Rakhimova – Melbourne 4 (draw)
 Caroline Dolehide – Monterrey (draw)
 Elixane Lechemia – Bogotá (draw)
 Ingrid Neel – Bogotá (draw)
 Hailey Baptiste – Charleston 2 (draw)
 Jennifer Brady – Stuttgart (draw)
 Marie Bouzková – Birmingham (draw)
 Jasmine Paolini – Hamburg (draw)
 Jil Teichmann – Hamburg (draw)
 Susan Bandecchi – Lausanne (draw)
 Simona Waltert – Lausanne (draw)
 Anna Danilina – Gdynia (draw)
 Erin Routliffe – Palermo (draw)
 Kimberley Zimmermann – Palermo (draw)
 Natela Dzalamidze – Cluj-Napoca (draw)
 Kaja Juvan – Cluj-Napoca (draw)
 Tereza Mihalíková – Portorož (draw)
 Andrea Petkovic – Chicago (draw)
 Ulrikke Eikeri – Tenerife (draw)
 Irina Bara – Cluj-Napoca 2 (draw)
 Ekaterine Gorgodze – Cluj-Napoca 2 (draw)

Mixed doubles
 Desirae Krawczyk – Roland Garros (draw)
 – 2020 Summer Olympics (draw)

The following players defended a main circuit title in singles, doubles, or mixed doubles:
Singles
 Ashleigh Barty – Miami (draw)
Doubles
 Hsieh Su-wei – Wimbledon (draw)
 Lucie Hradecká – Prague (draw)
 Elise Mertens – Indian Wells (draw)
Mixed doubles
 Barbora Krejčíková – Australian Open (draw)

Best ranking
The following players achieved their career high ranking in this season inside top 50 (in bold the players who entered the top 10 for the first time).

Singles

Doubles

WTA rankings
These are the WTA rankings and yearly WTA Race rankings of the top 20 singles and doubles players at the current date of the 2021 season.

Singles

Number 1 ranking

Doubles

Number 1 ranking

Points distribution

S = singles players, D = doubles teams, Q = qualification players.
* Assumes undefeated Round Robin match record.

Prize money leaders

Comebacks
The following is a list of notable players (winners of a main tour title, and/or part of the WTA rankings top 100 in singles, or top 100 in doubles, for at least one week) who returned from retirement or inactivity during the 2021 season:

  Carla Suárez Navarro (born 3 September 1988 in Las Palmas de Gran Canaria) In April 2021, Suárez Navarro announced that her Hodgkin's Lymphoma was in complete remission, and that she would commence a farewell tour beginning at Roland-Garros and culminating in a final US Open appearance, where she lost in the first round to Danielle Collins.
  Elena Vesnina (born 1 August 1986 in Lviv, Ukraine SSR, Soviet Union, modern day Ukraine) turned professional in 2002 and reached a career high ranking of 13 in singles in 2017 and number 1 in doubles in 2018. Vesnina's best result in a Grand Slam came at the 2016 Wimbledon championships, where she fell to Serena Williams in the semifinals in straight sets. She also won three WTA singles titles during her career. Her biggest success was in doubles, with 3 Grand Slam women's doubles titles alongside Ekaterina Makarova at the 2013 French Open, the 2014 US Open and at Wimbledon in 2017, as well as the mixed doubles title at the 2016 Australian Open alongside Bruno Soares. She also partnered Makarova to gold in the women's doubles at the 2016 Olympics, and to the title at the WTA Finals, both in 2016. Vesnina had been absent from the WTA Tour since 2018 following the birth of her daughter.
  Kim Clijsters (born 8 June 1983 in Bilzen, Belgium) initially entered the 2021 Miami Open, but pulled out, saying she did not feel ready to compete after her surgery and contracting COVID-19 in January. She played her first tournament of the year at the 2021 Chicago Fall Tennis Classic after accepting a wildcard, but lost in the first round to Hsieh Su-wei.

Retirements
The following is a list of notable players (winners of a main tour title, and/or part of the WTA rankings top 100 in singles, or top 100 in doubles, for at least one week) who announced their retirement from professional tennis, became inactive (after not playing for more than 52 weeks), or were permanently banned from playing, during the 2021 season:

  Gréta Arn (born 13 April 1979 in Budapest, Hungary) joined the professional tour in 1997 and reached a career-high ranking of No. 40 in singles in May 2011 and No. 175 in doubles in December 2000. She won two singles titles in her career.
  Timea Bacsinszky (born 8 June 1989 in Lausanne, Switzerland), has won four WTA singles titles in her 15-year career, where she reached a career high of No.9, and five doubles titles. She reached the semifinals of French Open in singles in 2015 and 2017. She also won a silver medal in doubles with Martina Hingis at 2016 Rio Olympics. Bacsinszky announced her retirement on 16 July due to constant injuries.
  Kiki Bertens  (born 10 December 1991 in Wateringen, Netherlands) turned professional in 2009, and reached a career high ranking of No. 4 in singles on 13 May 2019, becoming the highest ranking female Dutch player in WTA history; she had a career high doubles ranking of No. 16 in the world, achieved on 16 April 2018. She won 10 WTA singles titles, including two WTA 1000 titles at the 2018 Western & Southern Open and the 2019 Mutua Madrid Open, and also won 10 WTA doubles titles. Furthermore, she reached the quarterfinals of the 2017 Wimbledon Championships, and the semifinals on the 2016 French Open. She announced on 16 June 2021 that 2021 will be her final season due to ongoing injuries, and that her final event would be the 2020 Summer Olympics in Tokyo. Bertens officially retired from the sport after opening round defeats in both singles and doubles at the Olympics, ranked No. 24 in singles and No. 112 in doubles.
  Nicole Gibbs (born 3 March 1993 in Cincinnati, United States) joined the professional tour in 2013 and reached a career-high ranking of No. 68 in singles in July 2016 and No. 107 in doubles in September 2016. She announced her retirement in February 2021 after battling with oral cancer in 2019 and plans to attend law school.
  Anna-Lena Grönefeld
  Bojana Jovanovski Petrović
 Vania King (born 3 February 1989 in Monterey Park, California, United States)  turned professional in 2006 and reached a career high ranking of 50 in singles and 3 in doubles. King reached three WTA singles finals during her career, winning one of them at the Bangkok Open in 2006. She was most known as a doubles specialist, winning fifteen titles in her career, with her biggest achievements coming in winning the women's doubles events at both Wimbledon and the US Open in 2010, alongside Yaroslava Shvedova. King was hampered by an ankle injury throughout the final years of her career, and despite undergoing surgery in 2017, King decided to retire in February 2020 however due to the impacts from the COVID-19 pandemic, she officially retired in April 2021 following a farewell tour.
  Johanna Konta (born 17 May 1991 in Sydney, Australia) turned professional in 2008, initially representing Australia, before switching allegiance to Great Britain in 2012. She reached a career high singles ranking of No. 4 in the world on 17 July 2017, becoming the first British woman since Jo Durie to be ranked inside the top ten; she had a career high doubles ranking of No. 88 in the world, achieved on 1 August 2016. Konta won four WTA singles titles, including a Premier Mandatory title at the 2017 Miami Open, and became the first British woman to win a singles title on home soil since Sue Barker did so in 1981, doing so at the 2021 Nottingham Open. She reached the quarterfinals or better at all four Grand Slams, including reaching the semifinals at the 2016 Australian Open, 2017 Wimbledon Championships, and the 2019 French Open. Konta announced her retirement on 1 December 2021, after suffering from a long-term knee injury, and a rankings slide to No. 113 in the world.
  Alla Kudryavtseva (born 3 November 1987 in Moscow, Russia) turned professional in 2005 and reached a career high ranking of No. 56 in singles and No. 15 in doubles. Kudryavtseva reached two WTA singles finals during her career, winning one of them at the 2010 Tashkent Open. She was better known for her doubles prowess, winning nine doubles titles throughout her career, and reached the quarterfinals in women's doubles events at the Australian Open, Wimbledon Championships, and the US Open. She announced that she had retired from the sport on Instagram, on 2 November 2021.
  Yaroslava Shvedova (born 12 September 1987 in Moscow, Russia), turned professional in September 2005, representing Russia; Shvedova switched representation to Kazakhstan in 2008. She reached a career-high singles ranking of No. 25 in the world on 29 October 2012; she attained a career-high doubles ranking of No. 3 in the world on 22 February 2016. She reached two WTA singles finals, winning her only title at the 2007 Bangalore Open; she also reached the quarterfinals of three Grand Slam events in singles, at the 2010 and 2012 French Opens, and the 2016 Wimbledon Championships. Known for her doubles prowess, Shvedova won 13 WTA doubles titles, including two Grand Slam titles at the 2010 Wimbledon Championships and 2010 US Open, partnering Vania King; she also reached four further Grand Slam doubles finals, and reached the final of the 2010 French Open in Mixed Doubles partnering Julian Knowle. Shvedova holds the distinction of being the only player in tennis history to score a golden set in a Grand Slam main match; she achieved this feat in her third round match against then-world No. 10 Sara Errani at the 2012 Wimbledon Championships. Shvedova retired on 2 October 2021, after a commemorative ceremony held at the 2021 Astana Open, in Nur-Sultan.
  Abigail Spears
  Barbora Strýcová (born 28 March 1986 in Plzeň, Czech Republic), the No. 2 player in doubles as of 5 April 2021 and former No. 1 player (from July 2019), announced her retirement on 4 May 2021. Strýcová joined the professional tour in 2002 and reached a career-high ranking of No. 16 in singles in January 2017. She has won 31 doubles titles and 2 singles titles (Québec 2011, Linz 2017), as well as the bronze medal in women's doubles at the 2016 Olympics. She reached the singles semifinals and won the women's doubles title at the 2019 Wimbledon Championships and was also a member of the winning Czech Fed Cup team in 2011, 2012, 2014, 2015, 2016, and 2018.
  Carla Suárez Navarro (born 3 September 1988 in Las Palmas de Gran Canaria, Spain) turned professional in 2003. Suárez Navarro reached a career-high singles ranking of No. 6 in the world on 29 February 2016; her career-high doubles ranking was No. 11, achieved on 27 April 2015. Suárez Navarro won two WTA singles titles, including a WTA 1000 title at the 2016 Qatar Open, and won three WTA doubles titles. She also reached the quarterfinals in singles on multiple occasions at the Australian Open, French Open, and the US Open. In doubles, she reached the semifinals of the 2014 French Open, and the final of the 2015 WTA Finals, both with Garbiñe Muguruza. Suárez Navarro previously announced her retirement in 2020; in September 2020, she was diagnosed with Hodgkin lymphoma. In April 2021, She announced that her cancer was in complete remission, and that she would commence a farewell tour beginning at Roland-Garros. She retired from the sport after her participation at the 2020–21 Billie Jean King Cup Finals, in November 2021.

See also 

2021 WTA 125 tournaments
2021 ITF Women's World Tennis Tour
International Tennis Federation
2021 ATP Tour

Notes

References

External links 
Women's Tennis Association (WTA) official website
International Tennis Federation (ITF) official website

 
WTA Tour seasons
WTA Tour